Select Vacancy is the debut Album by the Australian Alternative rock artist Lisa Maxwell, released in 2006 by Essential Music Australia.  Tracks ""Delusion"" and ""Harmonic Rock"" also appeared on Lisa Maxwell's 2005 EP Bad Day.

Track listing
 "Select Vacancy"
 "Anna"
 "I Know"
 "Waste Of A Life"
 "Delusion"
 "Secrets And Lies"
 "Not So Easy"
 "Never Coming Back Here Again"
 "Harmonic Rock"
 "Same Story"
 "Out Of Sight"

References

2006 debut albums